Krantikaal  (English title: Critical Encounter) (2005) is an Indian Bengali feature film directed by Sekhar Das of Mahulbanir Sereng fame. It won award for best direction in 9th Dhaka International Film Festival.

Plot
The story is of terrorism that is plaguing different parts of the Northeast as the backdrop. Silajit Majumder, a militant on the run, takes refuge in a dilapidated mansion. Roopa Ganguly stays there with her father-in-law Soumitra Chatterjee and his father Haradhan Bandopadhyay who is confined to bed and is unable to speak. This film focuses on the friction and undercurrent of tension between the lady of the house and the terrorist. It leads to a brief mutual self-discovery that gives rise to compassion.

Cast
 Roopa Ganguly
 Soumitra Chatterjee
 Silajit Majumder as Rajib
 Haradhan Bandopadhyay
 Arjun Chakraborty
 Rita Dutta Chakraborty
 Rajesh Sharma
 Arkapriya Ganguly

Awards
2005 - National Film Award for Best Supporting Actor for Haradhan Bandopadhyay
2005 - National Film Award for Best Feature Film in Bengali
 BFJA Awards (2006)

 Best Actor Soumitra Chatterjee
 Best Actor in a Supporting Role Haradhan Bandopadhyay
 Best Cinematography : Premendu Bikash Chaki
 Best Director Sekhar Das
 Best Music Chiradip Dasgupta
 Best actress Roopa Ganguly at the Dhaka International Film Festival
 Best Director Sekhar Das at the Dhaka International Film Festival
 Best film Signis award, Belgium

References

External links
 Krantikaal in www.gomolo.in
 DVD/VCD Reviews, Movie Reviews, The Telegraph, 12 May 2006.
 BFI | Film & TV Database.

2005 films
2000s Bengali-language films
Bengali-language Indian films
Films featuring a Best Supporting Actor National Film Award-winning performance
Best Bengali Feature Film National Film Award winners